The 1929 Luft Hansa Junkers G.24 crash occurred on 6 November 1929 when a Junkers G 24 of Luft Hansa crashed at Godstone, Surrey, United Kingdom while on an international scheduled flight from Croydon, Surrey, United Kingdom to Amsterdam-Schiphol Municipal Airport, Amsterdam, Netherlands. Of the eight people on board, Glen Kidston was the only survivor.

Aircraft
The accident aircraft was Junkers G 24 D-903 Oberschlesien, c/n 911.

Accident
On 6 November 1929, the aircraft was operating a scheduled international passenger flight from Croydon to Amsterdam. The aircraft departed at 09:54. The weather at the time was poor. It was reported that the pilot may have been attempting to return to Croydon when the aircraft crashed into some trees at Marden Park, Godstone in thick fog. The aircraft burst into flames; three of the crew and three of the four passengers were killed in the crash. Passenger Glen Kidston escaped from the wreckage on fire, and extinguished the flames himself by rolling in the grass, sustaining minor injuries. Second pilot Prince Eugen of Schaumburg-Lippe also escaped from the wreckage, but he was seriously injured. Kidston raised the alarm and reported the accident to Croydon Airport. He was treated at Caterham Cottage Hospital. The fire was eventually extinguished by firemen from Caterham. Personnel from RAF Kenley assisted the local police in collecting the remains of the deceased and transporting them to a mortuary in Caterham. Von Schaumburg-Lippe died the day after the accident from injuries sustained in the crash.

After being treated for his injuries, Kidston returned to Croydon where he made a short flight, before returning home to Grosvenor Square, Mayfair, London. An inquest was opened at Caterham on 8 November. After hearing identification evidence, it was adjourned until 22 November, when it was hoped that Kidston would be fit enough to give evidence. The inquest resumed as scheduled. At the time of the crash, the aircraft was flying in a northerly direction. Von Schaumburg-Lippe had been thrown clear of the aircraft in the crash. A verdict of "accidental death" was returned in all cases.

Casualties
The nationalities of the victims were-

References

Aviation accidents and incidents in 1929
Lufthansa accidents and incidents
1929 in the United Kingdom
Aviation accidents and incidents in England
Disasters in Surrey
Tandridge
Airliner accidents and incidents with an unknown cause
1929 disasters in the United Kingdom
Airliner accidents and incidents in the United Kingdom
November 1929 events